Cranopsis was previously a genus of sea snails, marine gastropod mollusks in the family Fissurellidae, the keyhole limpets.

Cranopsis is since 2019 considered a synonym of Puncturella.

Description
The fissure lies about the middle of the anterior side. An internal vaulted chamber is found over the foramen, resembling that of Puncturella

Species brought into synonymy
 Cranopsis aethiopica (Martens, 1902): synonym of Rimulanax aethiopica (Martens, 1902)
 Cranopsis agger (Watson, 1883) : synonym of Puncturella agger R. B. Watson, 1883
 Cranopsis alaris Simone & Cunha, 2014: synonym of Puncturella alaris (Simone & C. Cunha, 2014) (original combination)
 Cranopsis antillana (Pérez Farfante, 1947): synonym of Puncturella antillana Pérez Farfante, 1947
 Cranopsis apostrema Simone & Cunha, 2014: synonym of Puncturella apostrema (Simone & C. Cunha, 2014) (original combination)
 Cranopsis asturiana (P. Fischer, 1882): synonym of Puncturella asturiana (P. Fischer, 1882)
 Cranopsis billsae (Pérez Farfante, 1947): synonym of Puncturella billsae Pérez Farfante, 1947
 Cranopsis canopa Simone & Cunha, 2014: synonym of Puncturella canopa (Simone & C. Cunha, 2014) (original combination)
 Cranopsis carinifera (Schepman, 1908): synonym of Puncturella carinifera (Schepman, 1908)
 Cranopsis cearensis Simone & Cunha, 2014: synonym of Puncturella cearensis (Simone & C. Cunha, 2014) (original combination)
 Cranopsis columbaris Simone & Cunha, 2014: synonym of Puncturella columbaris (Simone & C. Cunha, 2014) (original combination)
 Cranopsis cucullata (Gould, 1846): synonym of Puncturella cucullata (Gould, 1846)
 Cranopsis cumingii (Adams, 1853): synonym of Puncturella cumingii (A. Adams, 1853)
 Cranopsis decorata Cowan & McLean, 1968: synonym of Puncturella decorata Cowan & McLean, 1968
 Cranopsis enigmatica Simone & Cunha, 2014: synonym of Puncturella enigmatica (Simone & C. Cunha, 2014) (original combination)
 Cranopsis erecta (Dall, 1889): synonym of Puncturella erecta Dall, 1889
 Cranopsis expansa (Dall, 1896): synonym of Puncturella expansa (Dall, 1896)
 Cranopsis exquisita (Adams, 1853): synonym of Puncturella exquisita (A. Adams, 1853)
 Cranopsis floris Poppe, Tagaro & Stahlschmidt, 2015: synonym of Puncturella floris (Poppe, Tagaro & Stahlschmidt, 2015) (original combination)
 Cranopsis granulata (Seguenza, 1862): synonym of Puncturella granulata (Seguenza, 1863)
 Cranopsis hycavis Simone & Cunha, 2014: synonym of Puncturella hycavis (Simone & C. Cunha, 2014) (original combination)
 Cranopsis larva (Dall, 1927): synonym of Puncturella larva (Dall, 1927)
 Cranopsis major (Dall, 1891): synonym of Puncturella major Dall, 1891
 Cranopsis multistriata (Dall, 1914): synonym of Puncturella multistriata Dall, 1914
 Cranopsis nymphalis Simone & Cunha, 2014: synonym of Puncturella nymphalis (Simone & C. Cunha, 2014) (original combination)
 Cranopsis pelex Adams, 1860: synonym of Puncturella pelex (A. Adams, 1860) (original combination)
 Cranopsis pileolus Adams, 1860: synonym of Puncturella pileolus (A. Adams, 1860) (original combination)
 Cranopsis serraticostata (Herbert & Kilburn, 1986): synonym of Puncturella serraticosta Herbert & Kilburn, 1986
 Cranopsis tosaensis (Habe, 1951): synonym of Puncturella tosaensis Habe, 1951
 Cranopsis verrieri (Crosse, 1871): synonym of Puncturella verrieri (Crosse, 1871)

References

 Gofas, S.; Le Renard, J.; Bouchet, P. (2001). Mollusca, in: Costello, M.J. et al. (Ed.) (2001). European register of marine species: a check-list of the marine species in Europe and a bibliography of guides to their identification. Collection Patrimoines Naturels, 50: pp. 180–213
 Spencer, H.; Marshall. B. (2009). All Mollusca except Opisthobranchia. In: Gordon, D. (Ed.) (2009). New Zealand Inventory of Biodiversity. Volume One: Kingdom Animalia. 584 pp

Fissurellidae